Kenridge, also known as Colridge, is a historic home located near Charlottesville, Albemarle County, Virginia. It was built in 1922, and is a three-part plan dwelling, consisting of a two-story, five bay, main block flanked by one-story wings in the Classical Revival style. The house is built from hollow vitreous tiles faced with Flemish-bonded bricks.  The sections are topped by slate-covered hipped roofs.  It features a monumental two-story, tetrastyle portico with colossal Tower of the Winds columns on the front facade.

It was added to the National Register of Historic Places in 2008.

References

Houses on the National Register of Historic Places in Virginia
Neoclassical architecture in Virginia
Houses completed in 1922
National Register of Historic Places in Albemarle County, Virginia
Houses in Albemarle County, Virginia